Any Given Sunday is the soundtrack to the 1999 film of the same name. It was released on January 4, 2000, through Atlantic Records and consisted of a blend of hip hop, heavy metal, alternative rock, and R&B. The album found success on the Billboard charts, making it to No. 28 on the Billboard 200 and No. 11 on the Top R&B/Hip-Hop Albums, and featured the single "Shut 'Em Down", which peaked at No. 31 on the Hot Rap Singles.

Any Given Sunday, Vol. 2 picks up where the original soundtrack left off. Once again, actor Jamie Foxx closes the album out with the theme song, but cuts from Moby, Zapp & Roger, and Ozomatli are also featured. Ex-Band guitarist Robbie Robertson leads with five tracks, including "Bended Knee", "Ghost Dance", "Amazing Grace", and "Out of the Blue".

Track listing (soundtrack)

Track listing (Vol. 2)

Other songs featured in the film, but not on the soundtrack 
 Albo Gator - 4AD
 Bawitdaba - Kid Rock
 Bless Me Father - P.O.D.
 Blue On Blue - Robbie Robertson
 Boy - Trick Daddy Featuring Lost Tribe & JV
 Everloving - Moby
 Find My Baby - Moby
 Fleeting Smile - Roger Eno
 I Can't Face The Music - Billie Holiday
 I Didn't Know About It - Thelonious Monk
 Life Form - Hawkwind
 More Bounce To The Ounce - Zapp
 Motorbreath - Metallica
 Paranoid - Black Sabbath
 Rattlebone - Robbie Robertson
 Revolution - Kirk Franklin
 Right Here, Right Now - Fatboy Slim
 Rock And Roll Part 2 - Gary Glitter
 Spiritual - Bill Brown
 Supermoves - Overseer
 Take California - Propellerheads
 That's The Way (I Like It) - KC & The Sunshine Band
 The Wrestler - Slick Sixty
 Twilight Zone - 2 Unlimited
 Ultramarine - Michael Brook
 Viscaya Fight - Danny Saber
 We Will Rock You - Queen
 When Your Lover Has Gone - Ben Webster Featuring Oscar Peterson
 Use Me - Bill Withers
 My Weakness - Moby

References

Sports film soundtracks
Albums produced by Swizz Beatz
Albums produced by the Neptunes
2000 soundtrack albums
Atlantic Records soundtracks